John Lone (jyutping: zyun1 lung4; born October 13, 1952) is an American actor. He starred as Pu Yi in the Academy Award-winning film The Last Emperor (1987), for which he was nominated for a Golden Globe Award for Best Actor.

A veteran of the East West Players, he appeared in numerous high-profile screen and stage roles throughout the 1980s, 90s and early 2000s, in films like Iceman, Year of the Dragon, M. Butterfly, The Shadow, and Rush Hour 2. He was also nominated for the Independent Spirit Award for Best Supporting Male for his performance in The Moderns.

Biography
Lone was born in 1952 as Ng Kwok-leung in British Hong Kong.

He was raised in an orphanage and later adopted by a woman from Shanghai. At age 7, he was sent to train in the style of the Peking opera at Hong Kong's Chin Chiu Academy, where he was trained in singing, dance, and classical Chinese theater techniques. It was here that he was given the name "Johnny"; he chose the surname Lone to reflect the fact that he was an orphan and for its similarity to Leung, part of his given name.

Lone declined an offer to join a Belgian dance company, and a contract to make Kung fu films, and accepted a sponsorship by an American family. He moved to Los Angeles and spent three years taking night classes at Santa Ana College to improve his English. In 1972, he married fellow student Nina Savino and gained American citizenship. They divorced in 1979. In 1978, he graduated from the American Academy of Dramatic Arts in Pasadena, California.

Career
Due to the lack of roles in Hollywood for people of East Asian descent at the time, Lone was often left to play minor parts on television. Lone was with the Asian American theatre organization East West Players for ten years before Mako offered him a role as an Asian emigrant trying to assimilate in David Henry Hwang's first play FOB. Lone starred alongside Tzi Ma and his performance garnered him an Obie Award in 1981.

While in New York City he was discovered by the talent agent Jadin Wong, who helped him to launch his career. One of his earliest roles was as the cook in the film King Kong.

His first major role in films was as the title character in Iceman. In 1985, John Lone played the gang leader Joey Tai in Michael Cimino's Year of the Dragon, for which he was nominated the Golden Globe Award for Best Supporting Actor.

Impressed by Lone's performance, Cimino recommended Lone to his longtime friend Bernardo Bertolucci, who was casting for The Last Emperor. Bertolucci met Lone while casting in Los Angeles and chose him as Puyi at first sight. Lone portrayed Puyi at different stages of his life, from an 18-year-old to a man in his sixties. In preparation for his role, he visited China to study the body language of the elderly. He was nominated for a Golden Globe Award for Best Actor in a Motion Picture - Drama at the 45th Golden Globe Awards in 1988 for his performance. He and Chen presented the Academy Award for Best Documentary Short Film at the 1988 Academy Awards.

In 1987, David Henry Hwang and John Dexter were casting for Hwang's play M. Butterfly. Hwang knew of Lone's Peking opera training, and thought of him for the part of Song Liling, an opera singer. He sent him a copy of the script, but Lone was too busy to respond. In 1991, David Cronenberg prepared to direct the film adaptation of M. Butterfly, and invited Lone to play Song Liling. After a three-hour meeting with Cronenberg, Lone agreed to play Song. Lone did his own singing for the film. 

In the 1995 film The Hunted, Lone played assassin Kinjo alongside Christopher Lambert. Further international film appearances included the role of corrupt Hong Kong cop Ricky Tan in Rush Hour 2 (2001) and the antagonist Shiwan Khan in The Shadow (1994).

Lone's focus then shifted to the Chinese market. He played the Qianlong Emperor in the 30-episode television drama series Qianlong and the Fragrant Concubine (乾隆与香妃) in 2004. He also appeared in the title role of Kangxi Emperor, in Records of Kangxi's Travel Incognito (1998–2007), a Chinese television series about the Manchu-ruling Qing Empire monarch.

His last film role was 2007's War, co-starring Jet Li and Jason Statham.

Filmography

Film

Television

Awards & nominations

References

External links

 
 Message Board of John Lone

1952 births
20th-century Hong Kong male actors
21st-century Hong Kong male actors
American male actors of Hong Kong descent
American male film actors
American male television actors
Hong Kong emigrants to the United States
Hong Kong male film actors
Hong Kong male television actors
Living people